The 1953 Australian Championships was a tennis tournament that took place on outdoor Grass courts at the Kooyong Stadium in Melbourne, Australia from 9 January to 17 January. It was the 41st edition of the Australian Championships (now known as the Australian Open), the 12th held in Melbourne, and the first Grand Slam tournament of the year. American Maureen Connolly won the women's singles, the first step towards the first Grand Slam by a woman. Australian Ken Rosewall won the men's singles title.

Finals

Men's singles

 Ken Rosewall defeated  Mervyn Rose  6–0, 6–3, 6–4

Women's singles

 Maureen Connolly defeated  Julia Sampson 6–3, 6–2

Men's doubles
 Lew Hoad /  Ken Rosewall defeated  Don Candy /  Mervyn Rose 9–11, 6–4, 10–8, 6–4

Women's doubles
 Maureen Connolly /  Julia Sampson defeated  Mary Bevis Hawton /  Beryl Penrose 6–4, 6–2

Mixed doubles
 Julia Sampson /  Rex Hartwig defeated  Maureen Connolly /  Ham Richardson 6–4, 6–3

External links
 Australian Open official website

1953
1953 in Australian tennis
January 1953 sports events in Australia